The 2018 Coupe de Madagascar is the 2018 edition of the Coupe de Madagascar, the knockout football competition of Madagascar.

In the final on 7 October 2018, ASSM Elgeco Plus defeated AS Adema.

See also
2018 THB Champions League

References

Madagascar
Cup
Football competitions in Madagascar